Snelltown is an unincorporated community located near the southern tip of Howard County, Maryland.

History
Snelltown is a historic African American community settled by emancipated slaves of the Snell family located in North Laurel, Maryland. A small graveyard containing the town's founders remains on a lot.

Today
In the mid 1990s a land development company started to individually buy out the family properties and acquire estates with dozens of heirs without contact information. Each have been subdivided and developed as the Kings Arms subdivision.

See also
Snell's Bridge
Bacontown, Maryland

References

Unincorporated communities in Maryland
Unincorporated communities in Howard County, Maryland